Qin Jialin (March 25, 1919 – September 3, 2002) was a Chinese diplomat. He was born in Yinzhou District, Ningbo, Zhejiang. He joined the Communist Party of China in 1937 and the New Fourth Army in 1938. He worked at Xinhua Daily. He was Ambassador of the People's Republic of China to Syria (1969–1974), Denmark (1977–1982) and Morocco (1982–1983).

References

1919 births
2002 deaths
Ambassadors of China to Syria
Ambassadors of China to Denmark
Ambassadors of China to Morocco
People from Yinzhou District, Ningbo
Chinese Communist Party politicians from Zhejiang
People's Republic of China politicians from Zhejiang
Politicians from Ningbo